Mojaviodes is a genus of moths of the family Crambidae. It contains only one species, Mojaviodes blanchardae, which is found in North America, where it has been recorded from Texas.

The wingspan is about 16 mm.

References

Natural History Museum Lepidoptera genus database

Odontiini
Taxa named by Eugene G. Munroe
Crambidae genera
Monotypic moth genera